Ding Hui is a Chinese professional volleyball player currently playing for Shanghai Men's Volleyball Club. Ding was the first Chinese athlete of African descent to be selected for a Chinese national sports team.

Ding's selection to the team garnered widespread media attention, with some commentators saying he 'redefined race in China.' The coach of the national team, Zhou Jianan, was irritated by the number of calls he received inquiring Ding's family background. Zhou dismissed most of these calls, saying that he "fits the requirements established by the Chinese Volleyball Association" and that Ding's background is a "private matter." He prepared to play at the 2012 London Olympics but ultimately was cut from the team.

In his personal life, Ding is very popular among his teammates. He is a little shy but soon would become the favorite of everyone. "He's also a great singer and dancer and he brings more passion to the game than the other players," said Wang Hebing, the head coach of Zhejiang Volleyball team.

In 2012, Ding left Zhejiang men's volleyball team and went to study abroad before the new season started because "there's no future of this sport in China." He returned to China for some training, then returned to the U.S. He acted as a part-time volleyball coach.

Ding began playing volleyball for Warner University in 2014.

References

External links
 profile at FIVB.org

1989 births
Sportspeople from Hangzhou
Chinese men's volleyball players
Chinese people of South African descent
Living people
Volleyball players from Zhejiang
Warner Royals
Black Chinese sportspeople